The 1948 Akron Zippers football team was an American football team that represented the University of Akron in the Ohio Athletic Conference (OAC) during the 1948 college football season. In its first season under head coach William Houghton, the team compiled a 2–6 record (1-4 against OAC opponents) and was outscored by a total of 146 to 46. Ed Kirkpatrick was the team captain. The team played its home games at the Rubber Bowl in Akron, Ohio.

Schedule

References

Akron
Akron Zips football seasons
Akron Zippers football